Erebus gemmans is a moth of the family Erebidae. It is found in Asia, including China, India, Bangladesh, Bhutan, Nepal, Thailand, Burma, Malaysia, Taiwan, Sumatra and Borneo.

The wingspan is 62–82 mm.

References

External links
 Species info

Moths described in 1852
Erebus (moth)